Cryptocoryne dewitii is a plant species belonging to the Araceae genus Cryptocoryne. It was first described in 1977 from dried herbarium material and named in honor of the Dutch botanist Hendrik de Wit.

Distribution
Papua New Guinea

References

dewitii
Aquatic plants
Plants described in 1977